Georgi Marinov Panov (born 14 February 1933) is a Bulgarian former basketball player. He competed in the men's tournament at the 1952 Summer Olympics, 1956 Summer Olympics, and the 1960 Summer Olympics.

References

External links

1933 births
Living people
Bulgarian men's basketball players
1959 FIBA World Championship players
Olympic basketball players of Bulgaria
Basketball players at the 1952 Summer Olympics
Basketball players at the 1956 Summer Olympics
Basketball players at the 1960 Summer Olympics
Sportspeople from Pleven